Tenement at 75 Gdańska street is a historical habitation building located at 75 Gdańska Street, in Bydgoszcz. It is registered on the Kuyavian-Pomeranian Voivodeship Heritage List.

Location
The building stands on the western side of Gdańska Street, between Cieszkowskiego and Świętojańska streets. It stands close to notable tenements in the same street including: the Alfred Schleusener Tenement at 62, the Józef Święcicki tenement at 63, the Eduard Schulz Tenement at 66/68 and the Tenement at 71 Gdańska street.

History
The house was built in 1883.

In 1910 Wladyslaw Niezgodzki, a butcher, set up two shops on the ground floor. Several members of his family were butchers as well in Bromberg: Franz in Gdańska Street and Maryan in Długa Street. The shop stood there until 1928.

Architecture

The building was built in the eclecticism style, with Neoclassical forms, including: the facade is divided by slender pilasters, windows are topped with triangular pediments supported by corbels and a frontispiece adorned with a hermes's head overhangs the gate.

The building has been put on the Kuyavian-Pomeranian Voivodeship Heritage List Nr.601310 Reg.A/893, on November 12, 1992.

Gallery

See also

 Bydgoszcz
 Gdanska Street in Bydgoszcz
  Downtown district in Bydgoszcz

References

Bibliography 
  

Cultural heritage monuments in Bydgoszcz
Buildings and structures on Gdańska Street, Bydgoszcz
Residential buildings completed in 1883